"It Would Take a Strong Strong Man" is a song written by Stock Aitken Waterman for Rick Astley's  debut album Whenever You Need Somebody. It reached No. 1 in Canada, No. 10 on the U.S. Billboard Hot 100 and No. 1 for one week on the Hot Adult Contemporary chart.  and was not released in the UK and most of Europe.

Track listing
7" and cassette single
 "It Would Take a Strong Strong Man" – 3:39 
 "You Move Me" – 3:40

12" single
 "It Would Take a Strong Strong Man (Matt's Jazzy Guitar Mix)" – 7:46
 "It Would Take a Strong Strong Man (Instrumental)" – 3:39
 "It Would Take a Strong Strong Man" – 3:39 
 "You Move Me" – 3:40

Chart performance

Personnel
 Rick Astley: lead vocals
 Matt Aitken: guitars & keyboards
 Mike Stock: keyboards
 "A. Linn": LinnDrum programming
 Ian Curnow: Fairlight programming
 Dee Lewis, Shirley Lewis, Mae McKenna & Suzanne Rhatigan: backing vocals

References

External links

1987 songs
1988 singles
Rick Astley songs
Song recordings produced by Stock Aitken Waterman
Songs written by Pete Waterman
Songs written by Matt Aitken
Songs written by Mike Stock (musician)
RPM Top Singles number-one singles
RCA Records singles